Patrick Cornell (28 September 1932 – 24 February 2020) was a South African cricketer. He played in twenty first-class matches from 1951/52 to 1960/61. Following his cricketing career, he became the mayor of Pietermaritzburg.

References

External links
 

1932 births
2020 deaths
South African cricketers
Border cricketers
Eastern Province cricketers
People from Amahlathi Local Municipality